Flamville is a surname. Notable people with the surname include:

William Flamville ( 1325– 1396), English politician

See also
Aston Flamville